The Hatfield and Reading Turnpike , nicknamed the Gout Track, was an English  turnpike road created in the 1760s to provide a route that connected the Great North Road (the modern A1) with   the Holyhead Road (A5) and the Bath Road (A4). It had the advantage  that it made it possible for travelers to  avoid congested  London and was shorter in distance. In 1881 it was one of the last of the turnpikes to have its tolls removed.

Founding 
It is said that the Marquis of Salisbury, who lived at Hatfield House, wanted a route to the Great West Road avoiding central London, for onward travel to the spa towns of Bath and Cheltenham where, as a sufferer of gout, he often took the waters. This would also spare him the discomfort and congestion of London's cobbled streets. With others (including the Earl of Essex, who suffered from a similar affliction, and who lived at Cassiobury House near Watford) he sponsored an Act of Parliament passed in 1757 for the building of a road from Hatfield to Reading. The Reading and Hatfield Turnpike Trust was set up by a further Act passed in 1768, to improve the route between the two towns. It ran via St Albans, Watford, Rickmansworth, Amersham, High Wycombe and Marlow, with two alternative routes south and west from there, one to Knowl Hill (on the Great West Road between Maidenhead and Reading) and the other to Reading itself via Henley-on-Thames. The Trust lasted until 1881, and at that date was one of the last surviving Turnpike Trusts in the country. For many years the route was known as the Gout Track, given its reputed raison-d'etre.

Analysis of toll receipts shows that traffic was lighter than that on the great trunk routes it interconnected. Nevertheless, it stimulated the local economies along its route in trades like farriers, foraging and inn keeping.

Modern successor routes 

On classification by the newly formed Ministry of Transport in 1922, it formed parts of the A414 (Hatfield - St Albans), A412 (St Albans - Watford - Rickmansworth), A404 (Rickmansworth - Amersham), A416 (Amersham - High Wycombe - Marlow - Knowl Hill) and A32 (Marlow - Henley - Reading). In 1935, the A404 was extended along the A416 section between Amersham and the A4 to make it easier for those who wanted to use the route for its original function, while the A32 section through Henley was renumbered the A4155 .

South of Marlow the turnpike had two alternate routes -

 one to Knowl Hill (former terminus of A404) on the A4 to the west of Maidenhead with part now the unclassified Burchett's Green Road.
 or another  via Henley-on-Thames to Reading (now the A4155).

External links 

 "READING AND HATFIELD Turnpike Trust". The National Archives.  Contains Annual Statements of the trusts Income and Expenditure for the years:-1828; 1830 - 1843; 1851 - 1854; 1856 - 1857; 1859; 1861 - 1869 
''Watford Through Time'' by John Cooper, Amberley Publishing Limited, 15 Sep 2011.     Description of the turnpike in Watford where it was known as Hagden Lane or colloquially as Ricky Road.

References

Turnpike roads in the United Kingdom